At least two ships of the Royal Navy have been named HMS or HMT Horatio:

  was a 38-gun fifth-rate  launched in 1807 and eventually broken up in 1861.
  was a  naval trawler launched in 1940 that was torpedoed and sunk on 7 January 1943.

See also
  
 

Royal Navy ship names